The Gwächtenhorn is a 3,420 metres high mountain in the Urner Alps, located on the border between the cantons of Bern and Uri. It overlooks the Stein Glacier and the Susten Pass on its north side (Bern) and the Chelen Glacier on its south side (Uri).

Being covered by snow from the summit to the bottom, the north side of the Gwächtenhorn is much appreciated by skiers.

References

External links

Gwächtenhorn on Summitpost
Gwächtenhorn on Hikr

Mountains of the Alps
Alpine three-thousanders
Mountains of Switzerland
Mountains of the canton of Bern
Mountains of the canton of Uri
Bern–Uri border